The 2012 Korea Open Super Series Premier was the first tournament of the 2012 BWF Super Series. The tournament was held in Seoul, South Korea from 3–8 January 2012 and had a total purse of $1,000,000.

Men's singles

Seeds

  Lee Chong Wei
  Lin Dan
  Chen Long
  Peter Gade
  Chen Jin
  Sho Sasaki
  Nguyễn Tiến Minh
  Simon Santoso

Top half

Bottom half

Finals

Women's singles

Seeds

  Wang Yihan
  Wang Shixian
  Wang Xin
  Saina Nehwal
  Tine Baun
  Jiang Yanjiao
  Juliane Schenk
  Sung Ji-hyun

Top half

Bottom half

Finals

Men's doubles

Seeds

  Cai Yun / Fu Haifeng
  Jung Jae-sung / Lee Yong-dae
  Mathias Boe / Carsten Mogensen
  Ko Sung-hyun / Yoo Yeon-seong
  Koo Kien Keat / Tan Boon Heong
  Muhammad Ahsan / Bona Septano
  Chai Biao / Guo Zhendong
  Hirokatsu Hashimoto / Noriyasu Hirata

Top half

Bottom half

Finals

Women's doubles

Seeds

  Wang Xiaoli / Yu Yang
  Tian Qing / Zhao Yunlei
  Mizuki Fujii / Reika Kakiiwa
  Ha Jung-eun / Kim Min-jung
  Miyuki Maeda / Satoko Suetsuna
  Cheng Wen-hsing / Chien Yu-chin
  Shizuka Matsuo / Mami Naito
  Meiliana Jauhari / Greysia Polii

Top half

Bottom half

Finals

Mixed doubles

Seeds

  Zhang Nan / Zhao Yunlei
  Xu Chen / Ma Jin
  Joachim Fischer Nielsen / Christinna Pedersen
  Tontowi Ahmad / Liliyana Natsir
  Chen Hung-ling / Cheng Wen-hsing
  Sudket Prapakamol / Saralee Thungthongkam
  Songphon Anugritayawon / Kunchala Voravichitchaikul
  Thomas Laybourn / Kamilla Rytter Juhl

Top half

Bottom half

Finals

References

External links
Results on tournamentsoftware.com

2012 Korea Super Series
Korea Super Series
2012 Korea Open Super Series
Korea Open Premier
January 2012 sports events in South Korea